The 2021–22 Ardal NE season (also known as the 2021–22 Lock Stock Ardal NE season for sponsorship reasons) was the first season of the new third-tier northern region football in Welsh football pyramid, part of the Ardal Leagues, after the cancellation of the previous season due to the COVID-19 pandemic in Wales.

Teams
The league was made up of 16 teams competing for one automatic promotion place to Cymru North, whilst the second-placed team qualified for a play-off with the second-placed team of Ardal NW. Three teams were relegated to Tier 4.

Team changes

To Ardal NE
Promoted from Mid Wales Football League Division 2
 Dolgellau Athletic

From Ardal NE
Demoted to Mid Wales Football League East Division
 Montgomery Town

Stadia and locations

Source: Ardal NE Ground Information

League table

Results

References

External links
Football Association of Wales
Ardal Northern Leagues
Ardal Northern Twitter Page
Tier 3 Rules & Regulations

2021–22 in Welsh football
Ardal Leagues